Deudorix staudingeri, the Large Cornelian, is a species of butterfly belonging to the lycaenid family described by Hamilton Herbert Druce in 1895. It is found in the Indomalayan realm, where it has been recorded from Nias, Sumatra, Borneo, Peninsular Malaysia and Singapore.
The name honours Otto Staudinger.

References

External links

Deudorix
Butterflies described in 1895